Edmonton-Gold Bar is a provincial electoral district, in Alberta, Canada. The district is one of 87 in the province mandated to return a single member to the Legislative Assembly of Alberta using the first past the post method of voting.

The district is primarily urban and located in the central east portion of city of Edmonton. It was created in the 1971 boundary redistribution from part of Strathcona East.

In addition to its namesake neighborhood of Gold Bar, the riding also contains the neighborhoods of Capilano, Fulton Place, Terrace Heights, Forest Heights, Ottewell, Kenilworth, Holyrood, Avonmore, King Edward Park, Cloverdale, Bonnie Doon, Idylwylde & Strathearn.

The district is currently represented by Marlin Schmidt of the Alberta NDP.

History
The electoral district was created in the 1971 boundary redistribution from the old electoral district of Strathcona East.

The 2010 boundary redistribution saw significant changes to the riding. All the land north of the North Saskatchewan River was ceded to Edmonton-Highlands-Norwood, while the south boundary was moved from 92 Avenue to 82 Avenue to the Canadian Pacific Rail line to 63 Avenue into Edmonton-Mill Creek. The west boundary changed from Connors Road to travel through the Mill Creek Ravine further west in Edmonton-Strathcona.

Boundary history

Representation history

The electoral district was created in the 1971 boundary redistribution. The election that year saw Strathcona East incumbent Progressive Conservative MLA William Yurko run here due to his old seat being abolished.

Yurko faced two other candidates in the election held that year and won the new district with a comfortable majority to pick up the seat for his party. After the election Premier Peter Lougheed appointed Yurko as a cabinet minister. He ran for a second term in the 1975 general election. Yurko won a bigger percentage despite losing some of his popular vote as the opposition vote collapsed.

Yurko resigned from his cabinet post in 1978 with the intention of seeking the nomination the Progressive Conservative nomination in Edmonton East for the 1979 federal election. He won the nomination and resigned his seat in early 1979.

The election in 1979 saw Progressive Conservative candidate Al Hiebert easily win a four cornered race to hold the open seat for his party. Hiebert was re-elected with a larger majority in the 1982 general election.

The 1986 election in the district saw a major upset with Hiebert getting defeated by Liberal candidate Bettie Hewes who managed to increase the Liberal vote in the district by over 5800 votes. Hewes won a stronger majority when she was re-elected to her second term in the 1989 general election. She won a landslide running for her third term winning the highest popular vote of any candidate in the 1993 general election. After the election Hewes briefly served as a leader of the opposition and of the Liberal party. She did not run for re-election in 1997 and retired at dissolution of the assembly.

The current representative is Marlin Schmidt of the Alberta New Democratic Party, who was first elected in 2015

Legislature results

1971 general election

1975 general election

1979 general election

1982 general election

1986 general election

1989 general election

1993 general election

1997 general election

2001 general election

2004 general election

2008 general election

2012 general election

2015 general election

2019 general election

Senate nominee results

2004 Senate nominee election district results

Voters had the option of selecting 4 Candidates on the Ballot

2012 Senate nominee election district results

Student Vote results

2004 election

On November 19, 2004 a Student Vote was conducted at participating Alberta schools to parallel the 2004 Alberta general election results. The vote was designed to educate students and simulate the electoral process for persons who have not yet reached the legal majority. The vote was conducted in 80 of the 83 provincial electoral districts with students voting for actual election candidates. Schools with a large student body that reside in another electoral district had the option to vote for candidates outside of the electoral district then where they were physically located.

2012 election

References

External links
Website of the Legislative Assembly of Alberta
CBC's election coverage

Alberta provincial electoral districts
Politics of Edmonton